Saint Peter's School, often referred to as Petrischule (the German transliteration of its Russian name) is a secondary school in St. Petersburg. It is one of the oldest educational institutions in Russia, having been founded in 1709.

History
In 1705, Peter the Great decreed that Protestant churches could be established in St. Petersburg. The first reference to the school is in 1709, in a letter (now in the Archive of the Russian Navy) by Admiral Cornelius Cruys to the Emperor (Peter) regarding the establishment of a Lutheran church and school at his estate, located on the site of what is now the New Hermitage on Millionnaya Street in St. Petersburg's German settlement.

In 1761, the German theologian, geographer, historian, and teacher Anton Friedrich Büsching was invited by the Lutheran community of St. Petersburg to be headmaster of the school at the Lutheran Church of Saint Peter and Saint Paul.

The current school building, at numbers 22-24 Nevsky Prospect, was built in the 1760s and rebuilt several times - in 1799, in 1876–1877, and in 1913–1915.

Among the educators who taught at the school are:
The natural scientist Erik Laxmann (1737–1796).
The philosopher and Latin scholar Alexander Galich (1783–1848), who was a teacher of Pushkin.
The writer Ivan Born (1778–1851), compiler of the first Russian language textbook.
The writer and poet Vasili Popugaev (1778 or 1779–1816 (probable)).
The philologist and pedagogue Nikolai Gretsch (1787–1867).
The mathematician Nikolai Brashman (1796–1866).
The physicist Heinrich Lenz (1804–1865), discoverer of Lenz's Law.
The phalerist (scholar of medals) Julius Iversen (1823–1900).
The physicist Orest Khvolson (1852–1934).

War and Revolution
In 1912, the school celebrated its 200th anniversary. By this time it had become the largest secondary school in Russia, with more than 1600 students, of whom 25% were Russian. The school at this time enjoyed a stellar reputation for its broad education, particularly the teaching of foreign languages.

Under the direction of the church council of the Lutheran Church of Saint Peter and Saint Paul, the school's finances were kept on a sound basis, and further expansion and additions to the school buildings were planned.

Then came the First World War. With the war came anti-German sentiment. The Imperial Ministry of Education decreed that all classes were to be taught in Russian, and that the school name was to be written in Russian. Teachers who were not fluent in Russian left, and gymnastics instructor Anton Preis, a German national, was expelled by the authorities. Anti-German sentiment led some families to withdraw their children from the school, while senior students left to join the Russian army.

After 1918, the school bore the following names: United Soviet Labor School № 4, № 14, № 28, № 41, 222-I and 217-I Schools of the Kuibyshev district of Leningrad. In 1991 the school's historic name was restored.

Famous former pupils
 Friedrich Konrad Beilstein, chemist and systematiser of organic chemistry
 Nikolai Benois, architect
 Leonid Breitfuß, seabiologist and Polarscientist
 Alexander Brückner, historian
 Otto von Böhtlingk, indologist
 Daniil Charms, writer
 Georg Forster,  naturalist, ethnologist
 Alexander Galich, philosopher
 Michail Gromov, mathematician
 Wilhelm Junker, explorer of Africa
 Mikhail Kosakov, actor
 Peter Lesgaft, anatomist
 Lev Lossev, poet and critic
 Yuri Lotman, literary scholar, semiotician, and cultural historian
 Gregor von Helmersen, geologist
 Carl Friedrich Keil, German Lutheran Old Testament commentator
 Woldemar Kernig, physician
 Elisabeth Kulmann, poet
 Friedrich Martens, diplomat and jurist
 Nikolai Menshutkin, chemist
 Maximilian von Messmacher, architect
 Modest Mussorgsky, composer
 Theodor Pleske, zoologist
 Yakov Rekhter, network protocol designer and software programmer
 Carlo Rossi, architect
 Lou Andreas-Salomé, writer
 Gennadiy Shatkov, boxer
 Friedrich von Schubert, military general and geodesist
 Victor Schröter, architect
 Konstantin Thon, architect
 Pavel Chichagov, military and naval commander
 Fedor Linde, Russian revolutionary sergeant and commissar

Currently
As of the beginning of the 21st Century, the school had over 500 students and about 60 teachers. The German language is studied intensively and there are international student exchanges. The school maintains links with many schools in Germany and the Netherlands.

References

External links
Petrischule official website 
Encyclopedia of Petrischule 
Petrischule entry at the Encyclopedia of St. Petersburg

Sources

Materials of the Commission of the People's Educational Institutions, 1780-1790.  Central Government Historical Archive, Saint Petersburg.  Collection #733. 
 «Geschichte der St. Petri-Schule von 1862 bis 1887» dargestellt von E. Friesendorff 

The matter of awarding a decoration to Nikolay Ivanovich Grech, a teacher at the Petrischule, for honorable service and literary efforts, 1811.  Central Government Historical Archive, Saint Petersburg.  Collection #733, opus #20, document #122. 

Schools in Saint Petersburg
High schools and secondary schools affiliated with the Lutheran Church
Secondary schools in Russia
1709 establishments in Russia
Educational institutions established in 1709
Cultural heritage monuments of federal significance in Saint Petersburg